The Joch Pass (German: Jochpass) is a mountain pass of the Uri Alps, located between the Bernese Oberland and Central Switzerland, at the foot of the Titlis.

The track forms part of the Alpine Pass Route, a long-distance hiking trail across Switzerland between Sargans and Montreux.

See also
List of mountain passes in Switzerland

References

External links

Joch Pass on Via Alpina web site
Jochpass on Hikr web site

Mountain passes of the Alps
Mountain passes of Switzerland
Bern–Nidwalden border
Mountain passes of the canton of Bern
Mountain passes of Nidwalden